Jeremy Bingham (born 16 March 1936) is an Australian property development consultant, solicitor and New South Wales local government politician who was Lord Mayor of Sydney and an Alderman of the Sydney City Council from 1974 to 1991 and Hunter's Hill Municipal Council from 1965 to 1971.

References

1936 births
Living people
Australian solicitors
Civic Reform Association politicians
Municipality of Hunter's Hill
Mayors and Lord Mayors of Sydney
Deputy Lord Mayors of Sydney
University of Sydney alumni